The Tallmadge Amendment was a  proposed amendment to a bill regarding the admission of the Territory of Missouri as a state, under which Missouri would be admitted as a free state. The amendment was submitted in the U.S. House of Representatives on February 13, 1819, by James Tallmadge Jr., a Democratic-Republican from New York, and Charles Baumgardner.

The measure passed the House 87-76, with northern Representatives voting 86-10 in its favor and southern Representatives voting 66-1 against. However, the measure failed in the Senate, due to unanimous Southern opposition, joined by five northern Senators: Harrison G. Otis of Massachusetts, Ninian Edwards and Jesse B. Thomas of Illinois, and two others.

In 1820, the Missouri Compromise was passed, which did not include the Tallmadge Amendment. The Compromise attempted to appease both sides of the debate by admitting Missouri as a slave state in exchange for the admission of Maine as a free state and the complete prohibition of slavery in all of the remaining Louisiana Purchase territory north of the 36˚30' parallel.

Background
In response to the ongoing debate in Congress concerning the admission of Missouri as a state and its effect on the existing balance of slave and free states, Tallmadge, an opponent of slavery, sought to impose conditions on Missouri's statehood that would provide for the eventual termination of legal slavery and the emancipation of current slaves:

There were two senators from each state regardless of the population of the state. The number of seats in the House of Representatives, however, was based on the population of the state, and to further complicate matters, slave states were allowed to count three-fifths of their slave population to increase their number of representatives. The population of the North had grown more rapidly than that of the South, and the South also had a large percentage of slaves, which resulted in a lower countable populace. Thus, the proposed Tallmadge Amendment was seen as a way to further restrict the weight of the slaveholding South in Congress.

Tallmadge delivered an impassioned speech on February 16 in support of his amendment and of abolitionism in general. By a close vote on the same day, the House adopted the Tallmadge Amendment, but it was promptly rejected by the Senate. Congress adjourned on March 4, 1819 without acting on Missouri's request for statehood. Heated discussions regarding the Tallmadge Amendment and Missouri statehood continued through the summer and autumn.

Southerners in Congress asserted that the Tallmadge Amendment was unconstitutional because it put restrictions on states as a condition of admission to the Union. They argued that it was the decision of the people of Missouri, not Congress, to allow slavery there. The proponents of the Tallmadge Amendment argued that "slavery itself was a moral and political evil that was contrary to the spirit of the Declaration of Independence, and that it had been tolerated in the Constitution only by necessity and ought to now be restricted."

See also
History of slavery in Missouri

References

Pre-statehood history of Missouri
History of United States expansionism
Legal history of the United States
United States federal territory and statehood legislation
Presidency of James Monroe
16th United States Congress

External links
 The Tallmadge Amendment rings like “a fire bell in the night”.